The BR-287 is a  536.9 km-long federal highway across the Brazilian state of Rio Grande do Sul, also known as the Highway of Integration.

It starts in the Region of Porto Alegre, traverses the Center Eastern and Central West, and ends in the Southwest region.
It crosses the main tobacco-producing region of the country, in the cities of Santa Cruz do Sul and Venancio Aires, where there are many tobacco manufacturers and distributors, including Universal Leaf Tobacco, Philip Morris, Souza Cruz, Associated Tobacco Company and Alliance One.

Duplication

In 2019, the Federal Government announced that BR 287 was granted to the private initiative for 30 years, with the concession beginning in 2020. A duplication of the 204 km highway between Tabaí and Santa Maria will be carried out over 5 years of works in the urban section and 11 years in total, from the beginning of the concession. The forecast is that the stretch between Tabaí and Santa Cruz do Sul will be duplicated first, between 2026 and 2028, and the duplication between Santa Cruz do Sul and Santa Maria should occur between 2028 and 2031. The highway has a movement of more than 11 thousand vehicles per day, and normally a highway must be duplicated from the moment it reaches the movement of 7 thousand vehicles per day.

Gallery

References

External links
Nomenclatura das rodovias federais brasileiras

Federal highways in Brazil